Frederick Grocott (1900 – after 1924) was a Scottish footballer who made 60 appearances in the Football League playing for Lincoln City. He played at right back.

References

1900 births
Year of death missing
People from Paisley, Renfrewshire
Scottish footballers
Association football fullbacks
Walker Celtic F.C. players
Lincoln City F.C. players
English Football League players
Place of death missing